Jeffrey Hatcher is an American playwright and screenwriter. He wrote the stage play Compleat Female Stage Beauty, which he later adapted into a screenplay, shortened to just Stage Beauty (2004).  He also co-wrote the stage adaptation of Tuesdays with Morrie with author Mitch Albom, and Three Viewings, a comedy consisting of three monologues - each of which takes place in a funeral home.  He wrote the screenplay Casanova for director Lasse Hallström, as well as the screenplay for The Duchess (2008).  He has also written for the Peter Falk TV series Columbo and E! Entertainment Television.

Career

His many award-winning original plays have been performed on Broadway, Off-Broadway, and regionally across the US and abroad.  Some of his plays include Three Viewings, Scotland Road, A Picasso, Neddy, Korczak's Children, Mercy of a Storm, Work Song:  Three Views of Frank Lloyd Wright  (with Eric Simonson), and Lucky Duck (with Bill Russell and Henry Kreiger). Hatcher wrote the book for the Broadway musical Never Gonna Dance and the musical, ELLA.

Hatcher adapted Robert Louis Stevenson's novella, The Strange Case of Dr. Jekyll and Mr. Hyde, into a play in which actors play multiple roles, and Mr. Hyde is played by four actors, one of whom is female. The adaptation, which has been called "hipper, more erotic, and theatrically intense...definitely not your grandfather's 'Jekyll and Hyde'", was nominated by the Mystery Writers of America for an Edgar Award for Best Play.

Hatcher is a member and/or alumnus of The Playwrights' Center, The Dramatists Guild of America, Writers Guild of America and New Dramatists.

Work

Plays
 Scotland Road, 1993
 The Turn of the Screw, 1996 (adaptation of the novella of the same name by Henry James)
 Miss Nelson is Missing!, 1996, (based on the book by Harry Allard and James Marshall)
 Smash, 1997 (an adaptation of George Bernard Shaw's Novel An Unsocial Socialist)
 Pierre, 1998, (adapted from Pierre: or the Ambiguities by Herman Melville)
 What Corbin Knew, 1998
 Mother Russia, 1999
 Compleat Female Stage Beauty, 1999
 The Servant of Two Masters, 1999, with Emilo Paolo Landi (adaptation of the Goldoni commedia dell'arte play)
 Hanging Lord Haw Haw, 2000
 To Fool the Eye, 2000, (an adaptation of Jean Anouilh's Léocadia)
 Work Song: Three Views of Frank Lloyd Wright, 2000, with Eric Simonson
 Good 'n' Plenty, 2001
 Murder by Poe, 2003, (an adaptation of five stories by Edgar Allan Poe)
 A Picasso, 2005, (loosely inspired by actual events surrounding the Nazi persecution of "Degenerate art")
 Murderers, 2005
 The Falls, 2006
 Korczak's Children, 2006
 Armadale, 2007
 Dr. Jekyll & Mr. Hyde, 2008, (an adaptation of Robert Louis Stevenson's novella, using 4 actors to play the role of Mr. Hyde)
 The Government Inspector, 2008, (adapted from Nikolai Gogol)
 Cousin Bette, 2009, (an adaptation of Honoré de Balzac's La Cousine Bette)
 Bloody Radio Murders, 2010 (written for a MMW's drama club)
 Mrs. Mannerly, NY premiere 2010 
 Ten Chimneys, 2011
 Louder Faster, 2011 (co-authored with Eric Simonson, premiered at City Theatre)
 Sherlock Holmes and the Adventure of the Suicide Club, 2011 (premiered at Arizona Theatre Company)
 No Name, 2014 (an adaptation of the Wilkie Collins novel, premiered at Carthage College, then Edinburgh Festival Fringe)
 To Begin With, 2015 - revived in 2017 (an adaptation of The Life of Our Lord by Charles Dickens), premiered at the Music Box Theatre in Minneapolis and starred Gerald Charles Dickens
 "Glensheen", 2015 premiered at History Theatre in Saint Paul, MN
 The Alchemist, 2021 (an adaptation of the Ben Jonson play of the same name, premiered at The Red Bull Theatre in New York City)

Scripts
Film
 Stage Beauty, 2004
 Casanova, 2005 (co-writer)
 The Duchess, 2008
 Mr. Holmes, 2015
 The Good Liar, 2019
TV
 Columbo: Ashes to Ashes, 1998
 Murder at the Cannes Film Festival, 2000
 Upstairs, Downstairs: All the Things You Are, 2012
 The Mentalist: Forest Green, 2014

Awards and nominations
Edgar Award for Best Play for Dr. Jekyll and Mr. Hyde (nominated)

Notes

References
 Christopher Rawson, "Stage Preview: Prolific Writer's 'Work Song' pushes City Theatre's Limits", Pittsburgh Post-Gazette, Sunday, November 21, 2004.

External links

Jeffrey Hatcher - Downstage Center interview at American Theatre Wing.org

Year of birth missing (living people)
Living people
20th-century American dramatists and playwrights
Denison University alumni
People from Steubenville, Ohio
21st-century American dramatists and playwrights
American television writers
American male screenwriters
American male television writers
American male dramatists and playwrights
20th-century American male writers
21st-century American male writers
Screenwriters from Ohio